Access All Areas is the first live album by Spyro Gyra, released in 1984 on double-LP vinyl, cassette tape, and CD. It reached No. 77 on the Top 200 album chart at Billboard magazine and No. 1 on that magazine's Jazz Albums chart.

Track listing 

Bold: Available only on Vinyl & Cassette releases, omitted on digital versions of the album, in effort to bring the original albums for the cost of a single CD; since it cannot surpass over 80 minutes long.

Personnel 
 Jay Beckenstein – soprano, alto, and tenor saxophones
 Tom Schuman – keyboards
 Chet Catallo – guitars
 Dave Samuels – vibraphone, marimba
 Kim Stone – bass guitar, double bass
 Eli Konikoff – drums
 Gerardo Velez – percussion

References

1984 live albums
Spyro Gyra live albums
MCA Records live albums